Keith Mason,  (born 18 February 1947) is a former President of the Court of Appeal of New South Wales, the highest civil court in the State of New South Wales, Australia, which forms part of the Australian court hierarchy, serving between 1997 and 30 May 2008.

Mason is currently the chairman of the New South Wales Electoral Commission.

Biography
Mason graduated from the University of Sydney with degrees in Arts (1967) and law (1970). The university awarded him an honorary doctorate of laws in 2005.

Mason was admitted as a solicitor in 1970 and to the New South Wales Bar in 1972. He was appointed as a Queen's Counsel (QC) in 1981. He became president of the Court of Appeal in 1997. Mason was chairman of the New South Wales Law Reform Commission from 1985 to 1987 and 1989 to 1990. He was Solicitor-General of NSW from 1987 to 1997. Mason became president of the Children's Medical Research Foundation in 1995.

Mason has also been a justice of the Supreme Court of Fiji.

In 2006, he joined the Faculty of Law at the University of New South Wales as a Professorial Visiting Fellow. He is also a senior fellow at Melbourne Law School.

For many years Mason has been chancellor of the Anglican Diocese of Armidale. He is also the president of the National Appellate Tribunal, the highest ecclesiastical court of appeals in the Anglican Church of Australia.

Mason was appointed a Companion of the Order of Australia in 2003 for service to the law and legal scholarship, to the judicial system in New South Wales, to the Anglican Church, and to the community.

Honours
Mason was appointed a Companion of the Order of Australia (AC) in 2003 for "service to the law and legal scholarship, to the judicial system in New South Wales, to the Anglican Church, and to the community".

Publications

Mason is co-author of Restitution Law in Australia (1995) with Professor John Carter, as well as the second edition, Mason & Carter's Restitution Law in Australia (2008).

References

External links
Law Reform Commission of New South Wales

1947 births
Living people
Australian King's Counsel
Companions of the Order of Australia
Solicitors General for New South Wales
Judges of the Supreme Court of New South Wales
Presidents of the NSW Court of Appeal
Supreme Court of Fiji justices
Australian judges on the courts of Fiji
University of Sydney alumni